Amphiopini is a tribe in the subfamily Hydrophilinae of aquatic beetles, which was first described in 1890 by August Ferdinand Kuwert, and which has been synonymised with Chaetarthriini.

Members of this tribe are from 3 to 5 mm long.

Genera
(source Short & Fikacek, 2013)
 Amphiops
 Micramphiops

References

Polyphaga tribes
Hydrophilinae
Taxa named by August Ferdinand Kuwert
Taxa described in 1890